Clarke Timothy Gayford (born 24 October 1976) is a New Zealand radio and television broadcaster, presenter of the fishing documentary show Fish of the Day. He is the fiancé of Jacinda Ardern, who was prime minister of New Zealand from October 2017 to January 2023.

Education and career
Gayford was raised on a farm outside Gisborne. From the age of 11, he boarded at Palmerston North Boys' High School. In 1995, he matriculated at Otago University, Dunedin, to study for a Bachelor of Arts degree, before transferring to the New Zealand Broadcasting School in Christchurch. After he graduated from broadcasting school, Gayford successfully pitched student-life show Cow TV (1999) to Dunedin's Channel 9.

In 1999, Gayford appeared as a contestant on Treasure Island, a reality television game show. In 2003, he began broadcasting on the C4 music television channel, presenting youth programmes. In 2010, Gayford presented the third season of Extraordinary Kiwis, a biographical documentary series. Gayford also presented several radio shows, including morning and afternoon drive time shows on More FM and George FM, respectively.

In 2015, with producer Mike Bhana, Gayford created fishing show Fish of the Day, for Choice TV. The documentary series is also broadcast on National Geographic Channel, and has screened in over 35 countries. In 2021 Gayford hosted the television show Moving Houses. He made a guest appearance as himself in the first season 2 episode of Wellington Paranormal.

Personal life
Gayford is the eldest of three siblings. He was previously in relationships with musician Hollie Smith and Shortland Street actress Shavaughn Ruakere. 

Gayford and Jacinda Ardern began dating in 2013. In August 2017, Ardern was elected as leader of the Labour Party and, following a general election, she became prime minister on 26 October 2017. Gayford has been referred to as the spouse of the prime minister, although the couple are unmarried. He has accompanied Ardern on international visits, including the 2018 Commonwealth Heads of Government Meeting in London, UK.

On 19 January 2018, Ardern announced that she and Gayford were expecting their first child in June. Their daughter was born on 21 June at 4:45 pm in Auckland City Hospital.

In May 2019, it was reported that he and Ardern were engaged to be married. The wedding, scheduled for early 2022, was cancelled due to COVID lockdowns imposed in New Zealand.

On 8 May 2022, Gayford tested positive for COVID-19. As a result, he, Ardern and their daughter went into self-isolation for seven days. On 14 May 2022, Ardern tested positive for COVID-19.

Views and public image
In mid-April 2020, Gayford appeared on a short Wellington Paranormal video encouraging people who were looking after young children during the COVID-19 pandemic. In response, National Party Member of Parliament Brett Hudson expressed concerns during an Epidemic Response Committee meeting in early May 2020 that the video risked politicising the New Zealand Police. Police Commissioner Andrew Coster defended Gayford's presence on the grounds that he was a well-known television personality who had participated in the television series.

On 12 March 2021, Gayford attracted media attention when he posted a tweet stating that the New Zealand Cabinet had made an "in principle decision" pending final test results in relation to the lifting of a COVID-19 Alert Level 2 lockdown in Auckland. In response, his partner Prime Minister Ardern stated that Gayford had not been briefed on Cabinet's "preliminary decision" to move Auckland to Alert Level 1 that day.

Gayford said in a "scathing review" of an article written by former prime minister Sir John Key in September 2021: "It was such a shame that the name slinging [and] use of disinformation divided his contribution into partisan politics."  

In mid-January 2022, Gayford drew controversy after speaking to a pharmacist in December 2021 about obtaining rapid antigen testing for several musician friends. Gayford had claimed that there had been a change to testing guidance from the Health Ministry that would allow them to obtain rapid antigen testing instead of the more invasive polymerase chain reaction testing. Gayford was criticised by the National Party's COVID-19 Response spokesperson Chris Bishop for allegedly using his position as the Prime Minister's partner to obtain special favours for his friends. Gayford subsequently apologised for "any issues or confusion" this created for pharmacy staff.

Since becoming the partner of the Prime Minister, Gayford has been the target of false rumours that he was under police investigation or due to appear in court. In response to some of these rumours, New Zealand Police issued a statement in 2018 that Gayford "is not and has not been the subject of any police inquiry, nor has he been charged in relation to any matter." In July 2022, Gayford and NZME agreed to a confidential settlement, following remarks made on NZME podcast and digital radio channel KICK that were described as "damaging and untrue". The settlement included a confidential monetary sum paid to Gayford.

References

External links
 
 Fish of the Day – TV series

1976 births
Jacinda Ardern
Living people
New Zealand radio presenters
New Zealand television presenters
People educated at Palmerston North Boys' High School
People from Gisborne, New Zealand
Spouses of prime ministers of New Zealand